Gianmarco Gabbianelli (born 20 May 1994) is an Italian professional footballer who plays as a midfielder for  club Rimini F.C. 1912.

Club career
On 6 August 2021, Gabbianelli joined to Serie D club Rimini F.C. 1912.

External links

References 

1994 births
Living people
People from Fano
Sportspeople from the Province of Pesaro and Urbino
Footballers from Marche
Italian footballers
Association football midfielders
Serie C players
Serie D players
Inter Milan players
Aurora Pro Patria 1919 players
A.C. Prato players
Alma Juventus Fano 1906 players
S.S. Matelica Calcio 1921 players
A.C.D. Campodarsego players
U.C. AlbinoLeffe players
Rimini F.C. 1912 players